The Forty Elephants or Forty Thieves were a 19th to 20th century all-female London crime syndicate who specialised in shoplifting. This gang was notable for its longevity and skill in avoiding police detection.

History 

The Forty Thieves operated from the Elephant and Castle area of London. They were allied with the Elephant and Castle Mob led by the McDonald brothers. They raided quality stores in the West End of London and ranged all over the country. The gang was also known to masquerade as housemaids for wealthy families before ransacking their homes, often using false references. They were in existence from at least 1873 to the 1950s with some indications that they may have existed since the late 18th century. During the early 20th century the gang was led by Alice Diamond, known variously as the Queen of the Forty Thieves and as Diamond Annie and as a friend of Maggie Hill, sister to gangster Billy Hill.

Their heyday was in the interwar period when the gang raided on a large scale not only in the West End of London, but also other major shopping centres across the country. They also forced smaller gangs to pay tribute on what they had stolen and would punish criminals who did not obey their rules. The gang had its own set of rules and demanded loyalty from its members and others in their supply and distribution network. Alice Diamond ruled with absolute authority with the co-operation of Maggie Hill, Gertrude Scully, the Partridge sisters, and many others. Over seventy direct members of the gang operating in the 1920s and 1930s have been identified. Reports that the gang collapsed when their leaders were jailed for the 1925 Battle of Lambeth are incorrect. The gang was still in existence after World War II as new family members replaced old hands.

They were often said to be able to meet equal numbers of men in battle and were admired by their male counterparts in the Elephant Gang for their organisation and expertise. One member of the gang, Lilian Goldstein (née Kendall), was known to police as the Bobbed-Haired Bandit, the lover of Elephant Gang associate Ruby Sparks, and a driver on his smash and grab raids.

Methods 
It is unclear how long the gang operated. The earliest mention of the gang in newspapers dates to 1873, but police records from London indicate that female shoplifters had been active in the area since the late 18th century. The original gang members wore women's clothing which was modified to include hidden pockets. They could hide their loot in their coats, cummerbunds, muffs, skirts, bloomers, and hats. They raided the large stores of West End of London. Due to the prudish attitudes of the era, female customers were afforded privacy from the store staff, giving female shoplifters the opportunity to escape notice.

The gang stole goods worth thousands of pounds. The female gang members earned enough money to financially support their male spouses. The spouses in question included both idle men who lounged at home, and inmates of the British prison system.

The gang eventually became well-known to the area with the high-class shops which they typically targeted. Their mere presence could cause panic, eliminating the secrecy required for their activities. Their response to this challenge was to expand their activities from London to other British towns, where they were less known. They targeted rural areas and seaside towns.

During the 20th century, the gang modernized their activities. They invested in fast cars to transport their loot, and to use as getaway vehicles which could outrun the police. Loot was also transferred through the British railway system. The members used trains to travel to a town and deposited their empty suitcases at railway stations. During their return trip, the suitcases were filled with stolen goods.

Besides shoplifting the gang developed sidelines, such as looting houses and blackmailing individuals. Gang members used false reference letters to get hired as maids and then robbed the houses of their employers. They also managed to seduce men into brief affairs, and then blackmailed them with threats of ruining their reputations.

By the 1920s, the gang members started imitating the so-called bright young things group whose exploits appeared in the popular press. The gang members led extravagant and decadent lifestyles, by imitating the exploits of the era's movie stars and flappers. Part of their earnings were used to finance party events and to "spend lavishly" at the clubs, pubs, and restaurants which the gang members frequented.

The gang was particularly territorial of their turf. Other shoplifters who stole from shops on their turf were forced to pay the gang a percentage of their takings. If the intruders refused to pay, the gang arranged beatings and kidnappings of the offenders until the payment was received.

While various gang members were arrested and convicted at times, their prison sentences tended to be short. They could be sentenced to either 12 months of penal labour or 3 years incarceration. Once released, they returned to the gang. Several of the members remained with the gang for a relatively long time. A gang member known as Ada Wellman was initially arrested in 1921. She was still with the gang when arrested for another offence in 1939.

While the gang members often stole clothing items, they typically did not wear the stolen clothes. Their loot was distributed to a network of fences, street market traders, and pawnbrokers. Part of the stolen clothing items were sold to clothing stores, which simply replaced the labels and modified their designs. Some of the fences associated with the gang were also arrested, but could not be convicted. Ada McDonald was arrested as a suspected fence in 1910. She used ledgers of suspect authenticity to convince the authorities that the goods in her possession were the products of legitimate financial transactions. Jane Durrell, another suspected fence, and her common-law-husband Jim Bullock were both placed on trial in 1911. The jury decided that the police evidence against them was insufficient and they were acquitted of the charges and released.

See also 
 Gangs in the United Kingdom
 List of British gangsters

References 

1873 crimes in the United Kingdom
1873 establishments in England
1950s disestablishments in England
19th century in London
20th century in London
British female criminals
Former gangs in London
London Borough of Southwark
Organizations established in 1873
Organizations disestablished in the 1950s
Shoplifters
Women's organisations based in the United Kingdom
Flappers
19th-century British criminals
20th-century British criminals
1870s crimes in London